Urru Lake (）is a plateau lake in Nagqu Prefecture, Tibet Autonomous Region, southwest of China, located between Nyima County and Xainza County. The lake, which is part of the Siling Lake drainage system, is fed by several rivers and drains eastward into Jargö Lake. It is 33.6 km long and 13.4 km wide and has an area of 342.7 square km.

See also
 Bangecuo
 Gomang Co
 Namtso

Notes

Urru